The 2014 Indian general election polls in Kerala were held for the twenty Lok Sabha seats in the state on 10 April 2014. The total voter strength of Kerala for the election was 2,42,51,937 and 73.89% of voters exercised their right to do so. The results of the elections were declared on 16 May 2014.

Background
The United Progressive Alliance (UPA) government under the premiership of  Manmohan Singh completed its second term in May 2014 and general election was conducted to form a government to head the largest democracy in the world. The United Democratic Front (UDF), aligned to the national coalition of the UPA, the incumbent ruling alliance in the state legislature after wresting power from the Left Democratic Front (LDF), in the state assembly election of 2011. The buildup to this election saw parties shifting allegiance from both the prominent coalitions.

Alliances and parties

As in the previous general elections in the recent history of the state, the key alliances that fought for representation of Lok Sabha seats in Kerala in the 2014 general election are the UDF which is the Kerala state legislative alliance aligned with the UPA at the national level and the LDF comprising primarily the CPI(M) and the CPI. The nationally relevant National Democratic Alliance (NDA) has not had any success in general elections in Kerala so far but set up their candidates in all constituencies of the state. A new force in the election is the Left United Front. The debutant Aam Aadmi Party fielded candidates in fifteen of the twenty seats.

United Democratic Front

The United Democratic Front alliance saw the addition of two parties since the previous general election of 2009 while parting ways with one party that did not have any representation in the state legislature. The Socialist Janata (Democratic) (SJ(D)) joined the UDF in August 2010 splitting away from its parent Janata Dal (S) while the left leaning RSP docked itself to the UDF in March 2014, after the announcement of the general election.

Left Democratic Front

National Democratic Alliance

Left United Front
The Left United Front was launched in March 2014, by the Revolutionary Marxist Party, the Socialist Unity Centre of India (Communist) and the Marxist Communist Party of India (United).

Opinion Polls

Results

Summary of results

Party-wise detailed results

|- style="background-color:#E9E9E9"
! align=left valign=bottom rowspan=2 colspan=2|Party !! align=left valign=bottom rowspan=2 colspan=2|Alliance !! align=left valign=bottom rowspan=2|Abbr. !! align=center colspan=3|Candidates !! align=center colspan=3|Votes !! align=center colspan=3|Seats
|- style="background-color:#E9E9E9"
! align=center|No. !! align=center|+/- !! align=center|%  !! align=center|Number !! align=center|%  !! align=center|+/- !! align=center|No. !! align=center|+/- !! align=center|%
|-
| bgcolor=| || align=left|Indian National Congress || bgcolor=| || align=left|UDF || align=left|INC || 15 || || 75% || 5,590,285 || 31.10% || || 8 || 5 || 40%
|-
| bgcolor=| || align=left|Communist Party of India (Marxist) || bgcolor=| || align=left|LDF || align=left|CPI(M) || 10 || || 50% || 3,880,655 || 21.59% || || 5 || 1 || 25%
|-
| bgcolor=| || align=left|CPI(M) Independents|| bgcolor=| || align=left|LDF || align=left|IND || 6 || || 25% || 1,662,997 || 9.25% || || 2 || 2 || 10%
|-
| bgcolor=| || align=left|Indian Union Muslim League || bgcolor=| || align=left|UDF || align=left|IUML || 2 ||  || 10% || 816,226 || 4.54% || || 2 ||  || 10%
|-
| bgcolor=| || align=left|Communist Party of India || bgcolor=| || align=left|LDF || align=left|CPI || 4 || || 20% || 1,364,010 || 7.59% || || 1 || 1 || 5%
|-
| bgcolor=| || align=left|Kerala Congress || bgcolor=| || align=left|UDF || align=left|KEC(M) || 1 ||   || 5% || 424,194 || 2.36% || || 1 ||  || 5%
|-
| bgcolor=| || align=left|Revolutionary Socialist Party || bgcolor=| || align=left|UDF || align=left|RSP || 1 ||  || 5% || 408,528 || 2.27% || || 1 || 1 || 5%
|-
| bgcolor=| || align=left|Bharatiya Janata Party || bgcolor=| || align=left|NDA || align=left|BJP || 18 || || 90% || 1,856,750 || 10.33% || || 0 ||  || 0.00%
|-
| bgcolor=| || align=left|Socialist Janata (Democratic) || bgcolor=| || align=left|UDF || align=left|SJD || 1 ||  New || 5% || 307,597 || 1.71% || New || 0 || New || 0.00%
|-
| bgcolor=| || align=left|Janata Dal (Secular) || bgcolor=| || align=left|LDF || align=left|JD(S) || 1 || || 5% || 303,595 || 1.69% || || 0 ||  || 0.00%
|-
| bgcolor=| || align=left|Social Democratic Party of India ||  ||  || align=left|SDPI || 20 ||  New || 100% || 273,847 || 1.52% || New || 0 || New || 0.00%
|-
| bgcolor=| || align=left|Aam Aadmi Party ||  ||  || align=left|AAP || 15 ||  New || 75% || 256,662 || 1.43% || New || 0 || New || 0.00%
|-
| bgcolor=| || align=left|Bahujan Samaj Party ||  ||  || align=left|BSP || 20 || || 100% || 71,362 || 0.40% || || 0 || || 0.00%
|-
| bgcolor=| || align=left|Welfare Party of India ||  ||  || align=left|WPI || 5 ||  New || 25% || 68,332 || 0.38% || New || 0 || New || 0.00%
|-
| bgcolor=| || align=left|Kerala Congress (Nationalist) || bgcolor=| || align=left|NDA || align=left|KEC(N) || 1 || || 5% || 44,357 || 0.25% || || 0 || New || 0.00%
|-
| bgcolor=| || align=left|Revolutionary Socialist Party (Bolshevik) || bgcolor=| || align=left|NDA || align=left|RSP(B) || 1 || || 5% || 43,051 || 0.24% || || 0 || || 0.00%
|-
| bgcolor=| || align=left|Socialist Unity Centre of India (Communist) ||  ||  || align=left|SUCI(C) || 5 || || 25% || 18,128 || 0.10% || New || 0 || New || 0.00%
|-
| bgcolor=| || align=left|Communist Party of India (Marxist-Leninist) Red Star ||  ||  || align=left|CPI(ML)RS || 8 ||  New || 40% || 11,070 || 0.06% || New || 0 || New || 0.00%
|-
| bgcolor=| || align=left|Shiv Sena ||  ||  || align=left|SHS || 4 || || 20% || 10,181 || 0.06% || || 0 ||  || 0.00%
|-
| bgcolor=| || align=left|Socialist Republican Party ||  ||  || align=left|SRP || 2 || || 10% || 6,512 || 0.04% || || 0 ||  || 0.00%
|-
| bgcolor=| || align=left|All India Trinamool Congress ||  ||  || align=left|AITC || 5 ||  || 25% || 4,299 || 0.02% ||  || 0 ||  || 0.00%
|-
| bgcolor=| || align=left|Janata Dal (United) ||  ||  || align=left|JD(U) || 3 || || 15% || 3,865 || 0.02% || || 0 ||  || 0.00%
|-
| bgcolor=| || align=left|Rashtriya Janata Dal ||  ||  || align=left|RJD || 1 || || 5% || 1,376 || 0.01% || || 0 ||  || 0.00%
|-
| bgcolor=| || align=left|Republican Party of India (A) ||  ||  || align=left|RPI(A) || 2 || || 10% || 997 || 0.01% || || 0 ||  || 0.00%
|-
| bgcolor=| || align=left|Social Action Party ||  ||  || align=left|SAP || 1 || || 5% || 682 || 0.00% || || 0 ||  || 0.00%
|-
| bgcolor=| || align=left|Indian Gandhiyan Party ||  ||  || align=left|IGP|| 1 || || 5% || 546 || 0.00% || || 0 ||  || 0.00%
|-
| bgcolor=| || align=left|Republican Party of India ||  ||  || align=left|RPI || 1 || || 5% || 292 || 0.00% || || 0 ||  || 0.00%
|-
| bgcolor=| || align=left|Other Independents ||  ||  || align=left|IND || 116 || || || 334,936 || 1.86% || || 0 ||  || 0.00%
|-
| bgcolor=| || align=left|None of the above ||  ||  || align=left|NOTA || ||  ||  || 210,561 || 1.17% || New || 0 || New || 0.00%
|- style="font-weight:bold" class="sortbottom"
| colspan=5 align=left|Valid Votes || 289 || 72||  ||  17,975,893 || 100.00% ||  || 20 ||  || 100.00%
|- class="sortbottom"
| colspan=5 align=left|Rejected Votes ||  ||  || colspan=8|
|- class="sortbottom"
| colspan=5 align=left|Total Polled ||  ||  || colspan=8|
|- class="sortbottom"
| colspan=5 align=left|Registered Electors || ||  ||  ||   || colspan=5 align=left|
|- class="sortbottom"
| colspan=14 align=left|Sources: Election Commission of India
|}

Elected Members

Constituency-wise detailed results

Assembly-Segment-wise detailed results by constituency 
Based on the data from Chief Electoral Officer, Kerala

Kasaragod

Kannur

Vadakara

Wayanad

Kozhikode

Malappuram

Ponnani

Palakkad

Alathur

Thrissur

Chalakkudy

Ernakulam

Idukki

Kottayam

Alappuzha

Mavelikkara

Pathanamthitta

Kollam

Attingal

Thiruvananthapuram

See also
 Elections in Kerala
 Politics of Kerala

References

Notes

Indian general elections in Kerala
2010s in Kerala
Kerala